Mitotic checkpoint serine/threonine-protein kinase BUB1 beta is an enzyme that in humans is encoded by the BUB1B gene. Also known as BubR1, this protein is recognized for its mitotic roles in the spindle assembly checkpoint (SAC) and kinetochore-microtubule interactions that facilitate chromosome migration and alignment. BubR1 promotes mitotic fidelity and protects against aneuploidy by ensuring proper chromosome segregation between daughter cells. BubR1 is proposed to prevent tumorigenesis.

Function 

This gene encodes a kinase involved in spindle checkpoint function and chromosome segregation. The protein has been localized to the kinetochore and plays a role in the inhibition of the anaphase-promoting complex/cyclosome (APC/C), delaying the onset of anaphase and ensuring proper chromosome segregation. Impaired spindle checkpoint function has been found in many forms of cancer.

Increased expression of BubR1 in mice extends a healthy lifespan.

Clinical Significance 
BubR1 has been implicated in a variety of biological processes and pathologies, including cancer, aging, mosaic variegated aneuploidy (MVA), and heart disease. BubR1 protein levels are shown to decline with age. Furthermore, loss of BubR1 in young organisms is associated with rapid aging and premature onset of age-related diseases and phenotypes such as cardiac dysfunction, poor wound healing, cataracts, kyphosis, fat loss and muscle wasting (cachexia), and cancer. This has been demonstrated in mice.

DNA repair

Chemoradiotherapy (CRT), the combination of chemotherapy and radiotherapy applied with curative intent, is used to treat a variety of cancers.  CRT acts by inducing damage in the DNA of the cancer cells.  Bladder cancer tumor samples were taken from patients before treatment and from the same patients after CRT treatment when the tumors had reoccurred.  An increased level of BUB1B expression was found in the CRT-recurrent cells.  This increased expression was considered to facilitate an inaccurate DNA repair process termed alternative non-homologous end joining (A-NHEJ) that inaccurately repairs DNA damages such as those caused by the CRT. This inaccurate repair could cause additional mutations in the tumor including mutations to CRT resistance.

Interactions 

BUB1B has been shown to interact with:

 AP2B1
 BRCA2
 BUB3
 CDC20
 MAD2L1
 CBP
 SIRT2
 PLK1 
 PP2A-B56 
 HDAC1
 HDAC2 / HDAC3
 SNCG

References

Further reading

External links